Oppstryn Church is a parish church of the Church of Norway in Stryn Municipality in Vestland county, Norway. It is located in the village of Oppstryn, on the shore of the lake Oppstrynsvatnet. It is the church for the Oppstryn parish which is part of the Nordfjord prosti (deanery) in the Diocese of Bjørgvin. The white, wooden church was built in a long church design in 1863 using plans drawn up by the architect Hans Linstow. The church seats about 300 people.

History
The earliest existing historical records of the church date back to 1308, but the church was not new that year. The first church was a wooden stave church that was likely built during the 13th century. During the winter of 1662–1663, an avalanche off the nearby mountain pushed part of the church down the hill into the lake Oppstrynsvatnet. Some of the building furniture and structure was found scattered about the village afterwards.

The following spring, the remains of the old church were torn down. It was decided that a new church should be built in a less avalanche-prone site. The new building was a timber-framed long church. In 1863, this church was torn down and replaced with a new church on the same site. The new building was a wooden long church that was designed by Hans Linstow. It had a church porch with a tower on the west end and a choir on the east end of the nave. It was consecrated on 1 November 1863 by Rev. Wilhelm Frimann Koren. In 1908, it was discovered that the foundation under the tower base was failing, so a new foundation wall was built under the tower. In 1963, a sacristy was built on the east end of the choir. Also in 1963, a basement under the church was excavated to make room for bathrooms and equipment rooms for the cemetery.

Media gallery

See also
List of churches in Bjørgvin

References

Stryn
Churches in Vestland
Long churches in Norway
Wooden churches in Norway
19th-century Church of Norway church buildings
Churches completed in 1863
13th-century establishments in Norway